Buffalo Trunk Manufacturing Company Building is a historic factory and warehouse building located at Buffalo in Erie County, New York.  It is a five-story, eight bay, red brick, "L" shaped, flat roofed industrial building constructed in two phases, 1901–1902 and 1906–1907.  It is an example of "slow burn" masonry and wood factory construction.

It was listed on the National Register of Historic Places in 2010.

References

Gallery 

Industrial buildings and structures on the National Register of Historic Places in New York (state)
Industrial buildings completed in 1907
Buildings and structures in Buffalo, New York
National Register of Historic Places in Buffalo, New York